Attachment in children is "a biological instinct in which proximity to an attachment figure is sought when the child senses or perceives threat or discomfort. Attachment behaviour anticipates a response by the attachment figure which will remove threat or discomfort". Attachment also describes the function of availability, which is the degree to which the authoritative figure is responsive to the child's needs and shares communication with them. Childhood attachment can define characteristics that will shape the child's sense of self, their forms of emotion-regulation, and how they carry out relationships with others. Attachment is found in all mammals to some degree, especially primates.

Attachment theory has led to a new understanding of child development. Children develop different patterns of attachment based on experiences and interactions with their caregivers at a young age. Four different attachment classifications have been identified in children: secure attachment, anxious-ambivalent attachment, anxious-avoidant attachment, and disorganized attachment. Attachment theory has become the dominant theory used today in the study of infant and toddler behavior and in the fields of infant mental health, treatment of children, and related fields.

Attachment theory and children 

Attachment theory (developed by the psychoanalyst Bowlby 1969, 1973, 1980) is rooted in the ethological notion that a newborn child is biologically programmed to seek proximity with caregivers, and this proximity-seeking behavior is naturally selected. Through repeated attempts to seek physical and emotional closeness with a caregiver and the responses the child gets, the child develops an internal working model (IWM) that reflects the response of the caregiver to the child. According to Bowlby, attachment provides a secure base from which the child can explore the environment, a haven of safety to which the child can return when he or she is afraid or fearful. Bowlby's colleague Mary Ainsworth identified that an important factor which determines whether a child will have a secure or insecure attachment is the degree of sensitivity shown by their caregiver:

The sensitive caregiver responds socially to attempts to initiate social interaction, playfully to his attempts to initiate play. She picks him up when he seems to wish it, and puts him down when he wants to explore. When he is distressed, she knows what kinds and degree of soothing he requires to comfort him – and she knows that sometimes a few words or a distraction will be all that is needed. On the other hand, the mother who responds inappropriately tries to socialize with the baby when he is hungry, play with him when he is tired, or feed him when he is trying to initiate social interaction.

However, it should be recognized that "even sensitive caregivers get it right only about 50 percent of the time. Their communications are either out of synch, or mismatched. There are times when parents feel tired or distracted. The telephone rings or there is breakfast to prepare. In other words, attuned interactions rupture quite frequently. But the hallmark of a sensitive caregiver is that the ruptures are managed and repaired."

Attachment classification in children: the Strange Situation Protocol 

The most common and empirically supported method for assessing attachment in infants (12 months – 20 months) is the Strange Situation Protocol, developed by Mary Ainsworth as a result of her careful in-depth observations of infants with their mothers in Uganda(see below). The Strange Situation Protocol is a research, not a diagnostic, tool and the resulting attachment classifications are not 'clinical diagnoses.' While the procedure may be used to supplement clinical impressions, the resulting classifications should not be confused with the clinically diagnosed 'Reactive Attachment Disorder (RAD).' The clinical concept of RAD differs in a number of fundamental ways from the theory and research driven attachment classifications based on the Strange Situation Procedure. The idea that insecure attachments are synonymous with RAD is, in fact, not accurate and leads to ambiguity when formally discussing attachment theory as it has evolved in the research literature. This is not to suggest that the concept of RAD is without merit, but rather that the clinical and research conceptualizations of insecure attachment and attachment disorder are not synonymous.

The 'Strange Situation' is a laboratory procedure used to assess infant patterns of attachment to their caregiver. In the procedure, the mother and infant are placed in an unfamiliar playroom equipped with toys while a researcher observes/records the procedure through a one-way mirror. The procedure consists of eight sequential episodes in which the child experiences both separation from and reunion with the mother as well as the presence of an unfamiliar stranger. The protocol is conducted in the following format unless modifications are otherwise noted by a particular researcher:

Episode 1: Mother (or other familiar caregiver), Baby, Experimenter (30 seconds)
Episode 2: Mother, Baby (3 mins)
Episode 3: Mother, Baby, Stranger (3 mins or less)
Episode 4: Stranger, Baby (3 mins)
Episode 5: Mother, Baby (3 mins)
Episode 6: Baby Alone (3 mins or less)
Episode 7: Stranger, Baby (3 mins or less)
Episode 8: Mother, Baby (3 mins)

Mainly on the basis of their reunion behaviours (although other behaviours are taken into account) in the Strange Situation Paradigm (Ainsworth et al., 1978; see below), infants can be categorized into three 'organized' attachment categories: Secure (Group B); Avoidant (Group A); and Anxious/Resistant (Group C). There are subclassifications for each group (see below). A fourth category, termed Disorganized (D), can also be assigned to an infant assessed in the Strange Situation although a primary 'organized' classification is always given for an infant judged to be disorganized. Each of these groups reflects a different kind of attachment relationship with the mother. A child may have a different type of attachment to each parent as well as to unrelated caregivers. Attachment style is thus not so much a part of the child's thinking, but is characteristic of a specific relationship. However, after about age five the child exhibits one primary consistent pattern of attachment in relationships.

The pattern the child develops after age five demonstrates the specific parenting styles used during the developmental stages within the child. These attachment patterns are associated with behavioural patterns and can help further predict a child's future personality.

Attachment patterns 

"The strength of a child's attachment behaviour in a given circumstance does not indicate the 'strength' of the attachment bond. Some insecure children will routinely display very pronounced attachment behaviours, while many secure children find that there is no great need to engage in either intense or frequent shows of attachment behaviour".

Secure attachment 

A toddler who is securely attached to its parent (or other familiar caregiver) will explore freely while the caregiver is present, typically engages with strangers, is often visibly upset when the caregiver departs, and is generally happy to see the caregiver return. The extent of exploration and of distress are affected by the child's temperamental make-up and by situational factors as well as by attachment status, however. A child's attachment is largely influenced by their primary caregiver's sensitivity to their needs. Parents who consistently (or almost always) respond to their child's needs will create securely attached children. Such children are certain that their parents will be responsive to their needs and communications.

In the traditional Ainsworth et al. (1978) coding of the Strange Situation, secure infants are denoted as "Group B" infants and they are further subclassified as B1, B2, B3, and B4. Although these subgroupings refer to different stylistic responses to the comings and goings of the caregiver, they were not given specific labels by Ainsworth and colleagues, although their descriptive behaviours led others (including students of Ainsworth) to devise a relatively 'loose' terminology for these subgroups. B1's have been referred to as 'secure-reserved', B2's as 'secure-inhibited', B3's as 'secure-balanced,' and B4's as 'secure-reactive.' In academic publications however, the classification of infants (if subgroups are denoted) is typically simply "B1" or "B2" although more theoretical and review-oriented papers surrounding attachment theory may use the above terminology.

Securely attached children are best able to explore when they have the knowledge of a secure base to return to in times of need. When assistance is given, this bolsters the sense of security and also, assuming the parent's assistance is helpful, educates the child in how to cope with the same problem in the future. Therefore, secure attachment can be seen as the most adaptive attachment style. According to some psychological researchers, a child becomes securely attached when the parent is available and able to meet the needs of the child in a responsive and appropriate manner. At infancy and early childhood, if parents are caring and attentive towards their children, those children will be more prone to secure attachment.

Anxious-resistant insecure attachment 

Anxious-resistant insecure attachment is also called ambivalent attachment.  In general, a child with an anxious-resistant attachment style will typically explore little (in the Strange Situation) and is often wary of strangers, even when the caregiver is present. When the caregiver departs, the child is often highly distressed. The child is generally ambivalent when they return. The Anxious-Ambivalent/Resistant strategy is a response to unpredictably responsive caregiving, and that the displays of anger or helplessness towards the caregiver on reunion can be regarded as a conditional strategy for maintaining the availability of the caregiver by preemptively taking control of the interaction.

The C1 subtype is coded when:

"...resistant behavior is particularly conspicuous. The mixture of seeking and yet resisting contact and interaction has an unmistakably angry quality and indeed an angry tone may characterize behavior in the preseparation episodes..."

The C2 subtype is coded when:

"Perhaps the most conspicuous characteristic of C2 infants is their passivity. Their exploratory behavior is limited throughout the SS and their interactive behaviors are relatively lacking in active initiation. Nevertheless, in the reunion episodes they obviously want proximity to and contact with their mothers, even though they tend to use signalling rather than active approach, and protest against being put down rather than actively resisting release...In general the C2 baby is not as conspicuously angry as the C1 baby."

Anxious-avoidant insecure attachment 

A child with the anxious-avoidant insecure attachment style will avoid or ignore the caregiver – showing little emotion when the caregiver departs or returns. The child will not explore very much regardless of who is there. Infants classified as anxious-avoidant (A) represented a puzzle in the early 1970s. They did not exhibit distress on separation, and either ignored the caregiver on their return (A1 subtype) or showed some tendency to approach together with some tendency to ignore or turn away from the caregiver (A2 subtype). Ainsworth and Bell theorised that the apparently unruffled behaviour of the avoidant infants is in fact as a mask for distress, a hypothesis later evidenced through studies of the heart-rate of avoidant infants.

Infants are depicted as anxious-avoidant insecure when there is:

"...conspicuous avoidance of the mother in the reunion episodes which is likely to consist of ignoring her altogether, although there may be some pointed looking away, turning away, or moving away...If there is a greeting when the mother enters, it tends to be a mere look or a smile...Either the baby does not approach his mother upon reunion, or they approach in 'abortive' fashions with the baby going past the mother, or it tends to only occur after much coaxing...If picked up, the baby shows little or no contact-maintaining behavior; he tends not to cuddle in; he looks away and he may squirm to get down."

Ainsworth's narrative records showed that infants avoided the caregiver in the stressful Strange Situation Procedure when they had a history of experiencing rebuff of attachment behaviour. The child's needs are frequently not met and the child comes to believe that communication of needs has no influence on the caregiver. Ainsworth's student Mary Main theorised that avoidant behaviour in the Strange Situational Procedure should be regarded as 'a conditional strategy, which paradoxically permits whatever proximity is possible under conditions of maternal rejection' by de-emphasising attachment needs. Main proposed that avoidance has two functions for an infant whose caregiver is consistently unresponsive to their needs. Firstly, avoidant behaviour allows the infant to maintain a conditional proximity with the caregiver: close enough to maintain protection, but distant enough to avoid rebuff. Secondly, the cognitive processes organising avoidant behaviour could help direct attention away from the unfulfilled desire for closeness with the caregiver – avoiding a situation in which the child is overwhelmed with emotion ('disorganised distress'), and therefore unable to maintain control of themselves and achieve even conditional proximity.

Disorganized/disoriented attachment 

Ainsworth herself was the first to find difficulties in fitting all infant behaviour into the three classifications used in her Baltimore study. Ainsworth and colleagues sometimes observed 'tense movements such as hunching the shoulders, putting the hands behind the neck and tensely cocking the head, and so on. It was our clear impression that such tension movements signified stress, both because they tended to occur chiefly in the separation episodes and because they tended to be prodromal to crying. Indeed, our hypothesis is that they occur when a child is attempting to control crying, for they tend to vanish if and when crying breaks through'. Such observations also appeared in the doctoral theses of Ainsworth's students. Crittenden, for example, noted that one abused infant in her doctoral sample was classed as secure (B) by her undergraduate coders because her strange situation behaviour was "without either avoidance or ambivalence, she did show stress-related stereotypic headcocking throughout the strange situation. This pervasive behaviour, however, was the only clue to the extent of her stress".

Drawing on records of behaviours discrepant with the A, B, and C classifications, a fourth classification was added by Ainsworth's colleague Mary Main. In the Strange Situation, the attachment system is expected to be activated by the departure and return of the caregiver. If the behaviour of the infant does not appear to the observer to be coordinated in a smooth way across episodes to achieve either proximity or some relative proximity with the caregiver, then it is considered 'disorganised' as it indicates a disruption or flooding of the attachment system (e.g. by fear). Infant behaviours in the Strange Situation Protocol coded as disorganised/disoriented include overt displays of fear; contradictory behaviours or affects occurring simultaneously or sequentially; stereotypic, asymmetric, misdirected or jerky movements; or freezing and apparent dissociation. Lyons-Ruth has urged, however, that it should be wider 'recognized that 52% of disorganized infants continue to approach the caregiver, seek comfort, and cease their distress without clear ambivalent or avoidant behavior.'

There is 'rapidly growing interest in disorganized attachment' from clinicians and policy-makers as well as researchers. Yet the Disorganized/disoriented attachment (D) classification has been criticised by some for being too encompassing. In 1990, Ainsworth put in print her blessing for the new 'D' classification, though she urged that the addition be regarded as 'open-ended, in the sense that subcategories may be distinguished', as she worried that the D classification might be too encompassing and might treat too many different forms of behaviour as if they were the same thing. Indeed, the D classification puts together infants who use a somewhat disrupted secure (B) strategy with those who seem hopeless and show little attachment behaviour; it also puts together infants who run to hide when they see their caregiver in the same classification as those who show an avoidant (A) strategy on the first reunion and then an ambivalent-resistant (C) strategy on the second reunion. Perhaps responding to such concerns, George and Solomon have divided among indices of Disorganized/disoriented attachment (D) in the Strange Situation, treating some of the behaviours as a 'strategy of desperation' and others as evidence that the attachment system has been flooded (e.g. by fear, or anger). Crittenden also argues that some behaviour classified as Disorganized/disoriented can be regarded as more 'emergency' versions of the avoidant and/or ambivalent/resistant strategies, and function to maintain the protective availability of the caregiver to some degree. Sroufe et al. have agreed that 'even disorganised attachment behaviour (simultaneous approach-avoidance; freezing, etc.) enables a degree of proximity in the face of a frightening or unfathomable parent'. However, 'the presumption that many indices of "disorganisation" are aspects of organised patterns does not preclude acceptance of the notion of disorganisation, especially in cases where the complexity and dangerousness of the threat are beyond children's capacity for response'. For example, 'Children placed in care, especially more than once, often have intrusions. In videos of the Strange Situation Procedure, they tend to occur when a rejected/neglected child approaches the stranger in an intrusion of desire for comfort, then loses muscular control and falls to the floor, overwhelmed by the intruding fear of the unknown, potentially dangerous, strange person'.

Main and Hesse found that most of the mothers of these children had suffered major losses or other trauma shortly before or after the birth of the infant and had reacted by becoming severely depressed. In fact, 56% of mothers who had lost a parent by death before they completed high school subsequently had children with disorganized attachments. Subsequently, studies, whilst emphasising the potential importance of unresolved loss, have qualified these findings. For example, Solomon and George found that unresolved loss in the mother tended to be associated with disorganised attachment in their infant primarily when they had also experienced an unresolved trauma in their life prior to the loss.

Later patterns and the dynamic-maturational model 

Studies of older children have identified further attachment classifications. Main and Cassidy observed that disorganized behaviour in infancy can develop into a child using caregiving-controlling or punitive behaviour in order to manage a helpless or dangerously unpredictable caregiver. In these cases, the child's behaviour is organised, but the behaviour is treated by researchers as a form of 'disorganization' (D) since the hierarchy in the family is no longer organised according to parenting authority.

Patricia McKinsey Crittenden has elaborated classifications of further forms of avoidant and ambivalent attachment behaviour. These include the caregiving and punitive behaviours also identified by Main and Cassidy (termed A3 and C3 respectively), but also other patterns such as compulsive compliance with the wishes of a threatening parent (A4).

Crittenden's ideas developed from Bowlby's proposal that 'given certain adverse circumstances during childhood, the selective exclusion of information of certain sorts may be adaptive. Yet, when during adolescence and adult the situation changes, the persistent exclusion of the same forms of information may become maladaptive'.

Crittenden proposed that the basic components of human experience of danger are two kinds of information:

 'Affective information' – the emotions provoked by the potential for danger, such as anger or fear. Crittenden terms this 'affective information'. In childhood this information would include emotions provoked by the unexplained absence of an attachment figure. Where an infant is faced with insensitive or rejecting parenting, one strategy for maintaining the availability of their attachment figure is to try to exclude from consciousness or from expressed behaviour any emotional information that might result in rejection.
 Causal or other sequentially ordered knowledge about the potential for safety or danger. In childhood this would include knowledge regarding the behaviours that indicate an attachment figure's availability as a secure haven. If knowledge regarding the behaviours that indicate an attachment figure's availability as a secure haven is subject to segregation, then the infant can try to keep the attention of their caregiver through clingy or aggressive behaviour, or alternating combinations of the two. Such behaviour may increase the availability of an attachment figure who otherwise displays inconsistent or misleading responses to the infant's attachment behaviours, suggesting the unreliability of protection and safety.

Crittenden proposes that both kinds of information can be split off from consciousness or behavioural expression as a 'strategy' to maintain the availability of an attachment figure: 'Type A strategies were hypothesized to be based on reducing perception of threat to reduce the disposition to respond. Type C was hypothesized to be based on heightening perception of threat to increase the disposition to respond' Type A strategies split off emotional information about feeling threatened and type C strategies split off temporally-sequenced knowledge about how and why the attachment figure is available. By contrast, type B strategies effectively use both kinds of information without much distortion. For example: a toddler may have come to depend upon a type C strategy of tantrums in working to maintain the availability of an attachment figure whose inconsistent availability has led the child to distrust or distort causal information about their apparent behaviour. This may lead their attachment figure to get a clearer grasp on their needs and the appropriate response to their attachment behaviours. Experiencing more reliable and predictable information about the availability of their attachment figure, the toddler then no longer needs to use coercive behaviours with the goal of maintaining their caregiver's availability and can develop a secure attachment to their caregiver since they trust that their needs and communications will be heeded.

Significance of patterns 
Research based on data from longitudinal studies, such as the National Institute of Child Health and Human Development Study of Early Child Care and the Minnesota Study of Risk and Adaption from Birth to Adulthood, and from cross-sectional studies, consistently shows associations between early attachment classifications and peer relationships as to both quantity and quality. Lyons-Ruth, for example, found that 'for each additional withdrawing behavior displayed by mothers in relation to their infant's attachment cues in the Strange Situation Procedure, the likelihood of clinical referral by service providers was increased by 50%.'

Secure children have more positive and fewer negative peer reactions and establish more and better friendships. Insecure-ambivalent children have a tendency to anxiously but unsuccessfully seek positive peer interaction whereas insecure-avoidant children appear aggressive and hostile and may actively repudiate positive peer interaction. On only a few measures is there any strong direct association between early experience and a comprehensive measure of social functioning in early adulthood but early experience significantly predicts early childhood representations of relationships, which in turn predicts later self and relationship representations and social behaviour.

Studies have suggested that infants with a high-risk for Autism Spectrum Disorders (ASD) may express attachment security differently from infants with a low-risk for ASD. Behavioural problems and social competence in insecure children increase or decline with deterioration or improvement in quality of parenting and the degree of risk in the family environment.

Criticism of the Strange Situation Protocol

Michael Rutter describes the procedure in the following terms:

"It is by no means free of limitations (see Lamb, Thompson, Gardener, Charnov & Estes, 1984). To begin with, it is very dependent on brief
separations and reunions having the same meaning for all children. This may be a major constraint when applying the procedure in cultures, such as that in Japan (see Miyake et al., 1985), where infants are rarely separated from their mothers in ordinary circumstances. Also, because older children have a cognitive capacity to maintain relationships when the older person is not present, separation may not provide the same stress for them. Modified procedures based on the Strange Situation have been developed for older preschool children (see Belsky et al., 1994; Greenberg et al., 1990) but it is much more dubious whether the same approach can be used in middle childhood.Greenberg, M. T., Cicchetti, D. & Cummings, M. (Eds), (1990). Attachment in the preschool years; theory research and intervention. Chicago; University of Chicago Press. Also, despite its manifest strengths, the procedure is based on just 20 minutes of behaviour. It can be scarcely expected to tap all the relevant qualities of a child's attachment relationships. Q-sort procedures based on much longer naturalistic observations in the home, and interviews with the mothers have developed in order to extend the data base (see Vaughn & Waters, 1990). A further constraint is that the coding procedure results in discrete categories rather than continuously distributed dimensions. Not only is this likely to provide boundary problems, but also it is not at all obvious that discrete categories best represent the concepts that are inherent in attachment security. It seems much more likely that infants vary in their degree of security and there is need for a measurement systems that can quantify individual variation".

Ecological validity and universality of Strange Situation attachment classification distributions 
With respect to the ecological validity of the Strange Situation, a meta-analysis of 2,000 infant-parent dyads, including several from studies with non-Western language and/or cultural bases found the global distribution of attachment categorizations to be A (21%), B (65%), and C (14%). This global distribution was generally consistent with Ainsworth et al.'s (1978) original attachment classification distributions.

However, controversy has been raised over a few cultural differences in these rates of 'global' attachment classification distributions. In particular, two studies diverged from the global distributions of attachment classifications noted above. One study was conducted in North Germany in which more avoidant (A) infants were found than global norms would suggest, and the other in Sapporo, Japan, where more resistant (C) infants were found. Of these two studies, the Japanese findings have sparked the most controversy as to the meaning of individual differences in attachment behaviour as originally identified by Ainsworth et al. (1978).

In a recent study conducted in Sapporo, Behrens et al. (2007) found attachment distributions consistent with global norms using the six-year Main & Cassidy scoring system for attachment classification. In addition to these findings supporting the global distributions of attachment classifications in Sapporo, Behrens et al. also discuss the Japanese concept of amae and its relevance to questions concerning whether the insecure-resistant (C) style of interaction may be engendered in Japanese infants as a result of the cultural practice of amae.

A separate study was conducted in Korea, to help determine if mother-infant attachment relationships are universal or culture-specific.  The results of the study of infant-mother attachment were compared to a national sample and showed that the four attachment patterns, secure, avoidance, ambivalent, and disorganized, exist in Korea as well as other varying cultures.

Van IJzendoorn and Kroonenberg conducted a meta-analysis of various countries, including Japan, Israel, Germany, China, the UK and the USA using the Strange Situation. The research showed that though there were cultural differences, the four  basic patterns, secure, avoidance, ambivalent, and disorganized can be found in every culture in which studies have been undertaken, even where communal sleeping arrangements are the norm. Selection of the secure pattern is found in the majority of children across cultures studied. This follows logically from the fact that attachment theory provides for infants to adapt to changes in the environment, selecting optimal behavioural strategies. How attachment is expressed shows cultural variations which need to be ascertained before studies can be undertaken.

Discrete or continuous attachment measurement 
Regarding the issue of whether the breadth of infant attachment functioning can be captured by a categorical classification scheme, continuous measures of attachment security have been developed which have demonstrated adequate psychometric properties. These have been used either individually or in conjunction with discrete attachment classifications in many published reports. The original Richter's et al. (1998) scale is strongly related to secure versus insecure classifications, correctly predicting about 90% of cases. Readers further interested in the categorical versus continuous nature of attachment classifications (and the debate surrounding this issue) should consult a paper by Fraley and Spieker and the rejoinders in the same issue by many prominent attachment researchers including J. Cassidy, A. Sroufe, E. Waters & T. Beauchaine, and M. Cummings.

See also

References

Recommended reading 
 Cassidy, J., & Shaver, P., (Eds). (1999) Handbook of Attachment: Theory, Research, and Clinical Applications. Guilford Press, NY.
 Greenberg, MT, Cicchetti, D., & Cummings, EM., (Eds) (1990) Attachment in the Preschool Years: Theory, Research and Intervention University of Chicago, Chicago.
 Greenspan, S. (1993) Infancy and Early Childhood.  Madison, CT: International Universities Press.  .
 Holmes, J. (1993) John Bowlby and Attachment Theory. Routledge. .
 Holmes, J. (2001) The Search for the Secure Base: Attachment Theory and Psychotherapy. London: Brunner-Routledge. .
 Karen R (1998) Becoming Attached: First Relationships and How They Shape Our Capacity to Love. Oxford University Press. .
 Zeanah, C., (1993) Handbook of Infant Mental Health. Guilford, NY.
 Parkes, CM, Stevenson-Hinde, J., Marris, P., (Eds.) (1991) Attachment Across The Life Cycle Routledge. NY.  
 Siegler R., DeLoache, J. & Eisenberg, N. (2003) How Children develop. New York: Worth. .
 Bausch, Karl Heinz (2002) Treating Attachment Disorders NY: Guilford Press.
 Mercer, J. Understanding Attachment, Praeger 2005.

Love
Interpersonal relationships
Human development
Attachment theory
Adoption, fostering, orphan care and displacement
Evolutionary psychology

he:תאוריית ההתקשרות
fi:Kiintymyssuhdeteoria
sv:Anknytning
zh:依附理論